Dorothy Vernon (born Dorothea Christine Arens, November 11, 1875 – October 28, 1970) was a German-born American film actress. 

Born Dorothea Christine Arens as the daughter of a Lighthouse warden, she emigrated into the United States as late as 1897. She appeared in more than 130 films between 1919 and 1956. She died in Granada Hills, California from heart disease, aged 94. Her son was actor and entertainer Bobby Vernon.

Selected filmography

 Jazz and Jailbirds (1919)
 The Grocery Clerk (1919)
 The Fighting Guide (1922)
 Conductor 1492 (1924)
 Commencement Day (1924)
 Cradle Robbers (1924)
 Dog Days (1925)
 Tricks (1925)
 The Flying Fool (1925)
 Buried Treasure (1926)
 Telling Whoppers (1926)
 Twinkletoes (1926)
 Heebee Jeebees (1927)
 Tenderloin (1928)
 Should a Girl Marry? (1928)
 Manhattan Cowboy (1928)
 Cat, Dog & Co. (1929)
 An Oklahoma Cowboy (1929)
 Riders of the Storm (1929)
 Headin' Westward (1929)
 The Costello Case (1930)
 Forgotten Women (1931)
 Sister to Judas (1932)
 Malay Nights (1932)
 East of Fifth Avenue (1933)
 The Laughter of Fools (1933)
 Please (1933)
 Unknown Valley (1933)
 Cleaning Up (1933)
 Alimony Madness (1933)
 Woman Haters (1934)
 Flat Number Three (1934)
 City of Beautiful Nonsense (1935)
 Father O'Flynn (1935)
 The Speed Reporter (1936)
 Old Mother Riley (1937)
 Melody of My Heart (1937)
 Raw Timber (1937)
 Slightly Dangerous (1943)
 Booby Dupes (1945)
 The Millerson Case (1947)
 Rusty's Birthday (1949)
 A Place in the Sun (1951)
 The President's Lady (1953)
 Women's Prison (1955)
 Jeanne Eagels (1957)

References

External links

1875 births
1970 deaths
American film actresses
American silent film actresses
20th-century American actresses
Emigrants from the German Empire to the United States
People from Granada Hills, Los Angeles